Mason Duval (born 24 August 2001) is a Caymanian footballer currently playing for North Carolina Fusion U23 of the USL League Two, and the Cayman Islands national team.

Club career
For the 2021 season, Duval joined North Carolina Fusion U23 of the USL League Two. That year, the team advanced to the league final before falling to the Des Moines Menace 0–1. During the regular season, Duval scored eight goals in eight matches.

Career statistics

International

References

External links
 National Football Teams profile
 Soccerway profile
 Mason Duval at the Elon University
 USL League Two profile

2001 births
Living people
Elon Phoenix men's soccer players
Association football forwards
Caymanian footballers
Cayman Islands under-20 international footballers
Cayman Islands international footballers
Caymanian expatriate footballers
Caymanian expatriate sportspeople in the United States
Expatriate soccer players in the United States